Bandeira, a Portuguese-language word for flag, may refer to:

People
Bandeira (surname)

Places
Bandeira, Minas Gerais, Brazil, a municipality
Bandeira do Sul, Minas Gerais, Brazil
Bandeira River (Chopim River tributary), Brazil
Bandeira River (Piquiri River tributary), Brazil
Pico da Bandeira, the third highest mountain in Brazil
Bandeira Waterfall, East Timor

See also
Bandeirantes (disambiguation)
Bandeiras (Madalena), a civil parish in the Azores
Banderas (disambiguation)